The Chusovaya is a river flowing in Perm Krai, Sverdlovsk Oblast and Chelyabinsk Oblast of Russia. A tributary of the Kama, which in turn is a tributary of the Volga, it discharges into the Chusovskoy Cove of the Kamsky Reservoir. The river is remarkable in that it originates on the eastern slopes of the Ural Mountains in Asia, crosses the mountains, and mostly runs on their western slopes in Europe. The Chusovaya River is widely used as a source of water. In particular, its water is taken from the Volchikhinsky Reservoir, to the Verkhneisetsky Reservoir to supply the major city of Yekaterinburg. Fifteen smaller reservoirs are spread over about 150 tributaries of the river.

There are numerous metal and coal mines along the Chusovaya, and the river was intensively used to deliver their production to the western Russia. However, industrial navigation nearly halted with the development of railways in the early 20th century. Chusovoy is the major remaining port on the river.

The Chusovaya River is famous for its hundreds of large rocks located along the shoreline (see infobox image) which are the major tourist attraction of the area. Some rocks posed much danger to boats, especially during the spring thaw. They are generally called boitsy (lit. fighters). Many of them have individual names and are protected by the state as natural monuments.

Hydrography 
It has two sources: Poludennaya Chusovaya and Western (Zapadanaya) Chusovaya. The former originates in a swampy area in the north of Chelyabinsk Oblast and flows to the north. After , it merges with the Western Chusovaya, which starts at the Ufaley ridge. In the upper stream Chusovaya takes many tributaries and shows on its shores outcrops of crystalline shale, which were formed through the interaction of magmatic and sedimentary rocks.

In the middle reaches, the river slopes have canyon-like character. Here the river cuts through several low mountain ranges, which tower above the riverbed as cliffs called boitsy. There are about 200 of them in the middle reaches and about 50 are protected by the state as natural monuments. Limestone is prone to weathering which often creates peculiar shapes. Karst processes created numerous caves and grottoes in this area. Large boulders sometimes protrude above the water surface.

In the lower reaches, after exiting from the Ural Mountains, the river has a plain character. The bottom of the river throughout its length is mainly covered in pebbles.

Chusovaya usually freezes in late October through early December and thaws in April. The river is fed by snow (55%). precipitation (29%) and underground waters (18%). The floods typically occur between mid-April and mid-June.

Tributaries

Chusovaya takes more than 150 tributaries with the largest being the river Sylva. The Kumysh tributary dives underground for about 6 km; the place where it disappears is called нырок in Russian ("dive" in English) by the local people, and the place where it resurfaces is named вынырок ("coming to the surface"). Such behavior is unusual but not unique to Kumysh and is observed for about 15 other rivers of the Urals. The main tributaries of the Chusovaya are from source to mouth:

Revda (left)
Bolshoy Shishim (right)
Utka (left)
Sulyom (right)
Mezhevaya Utka (right)
Serebryanka (right)
Sylvitsa (right)
Kumysh (left)
Koyva (right)
Usva (right)
Lysva (left)
Sylva (left)

Flora and fauna
The upper reaches of the Chusovaya have abundant marshes and meadows. Forests are rare and are mostly pine forests. The middle reaches are covered by boreal coniferous forests, which are dominated by pine, Siberian Pine, larch and fir. Forests are scarce also in the lower reaches and mostly contain aspen, birch, mountain ash and willow. Fishes include minnow, bass, ruffe, roach, pike, ide (Leuciscus idus), chub (Squalius cephalus) and bream. There are colonies of crayfish. The tributaries show traces of beavers and the main river hosts muskrats. In the autumn, the river is visited by ducks, geese and other waterfowl. The surrounding forests are inhabited by usual taiga animals such as moose, brown bear, wolf, lynx, fox, hare, squirrel, hazel grouse and black grouse.

History
The river had long been inhabited by people, as evident from numerous Neolithic and Bronze Age settlements found on the river banks. The 15th Century chronicler Giacomo Filippo Foresti (a.k.a. Jacobus Philippus Foresti da Bergamo) mentioned a river in the area named the Thisageta, and the 19th Century archaeologist Sir Ellis Minns proposed that the Chusovaya may originally have been named after the Thyssagetae, a little-known steppe tribe who apparently lived in the area.

In the Middle Ages, the river basin was mostly populated by Bashkirs, Mansi and Komi-Permyaks. It is assumed that the Battle of Chulmandore, in which Komi-Permyaks defeated Mongols, occurred near the river mouth. The Chusovaya River was first mentioned in 1396 in the Novgorod chronicles. Russians started active explorations of the Urals in the early 16th century, and the first Russian settlement Nizhnechusovskie Gorodki appeared on Chusovaya in 1568. From 1579, the garrison of this settlement was headed by the Russian explorer Ermak. The entire river basin was then owned by merchants Stroganov. Stroganovs in particular supplied the expedition of Ermak in the autumn of 1581 up the Chusovaya and beyond the Urals.

Subsequently, the vast lands beyond the Urals, including the upper Chusovaya, were given to Demidov, and the border between the possessions of Stroganov and Demidov was at the river Mezhevaya Utka. Demidov was actively exploring the rich local deposits in his lands and built several iron works, including Polevskoy (1722), Vasilyevo-Shaitansky (1732), Sredneuralskiy (1734) and Seversky (1735).

Before construction of the railway across the Urals, the river served as an important route for transporting metals and fur from the Urals to the western Russia. The first port for this purpose was built in the mouth of the Utka tributary in 1703 by the orders of Peter the Great. Every spring, with the start of the flood, heavily loaded barges were sent from the wharf in the upper Chusovaya to Perm. It was rather difficult to navigate heavy wooden ships through the fast and winding river and many were crashing to the coastal cliffs. About 50 barges had major accidents between 1857 and 1861 on the Chusovaya. In the spring of 1877 alone, 47 barges sank drowning more than 100 men, 23 of those barges crashed at one and the same cliff Brigand. Massive efforts were spent from the 17th through 19th centuries to improve the navigation conditions on Chusovaya. The most dangerous shore cliffs were blown up with dynamite, including the Brigand (this was one of the world's first controlled underwater explosions.) Smaller boulders protruding at the river center were removed, and hundreds mooring poles had been installed. Logs were set up in the places where the currents tended to wash up boats on the rocks in order to soften the impact. These measures drastically reduced the number of accidents (from 10% to 4% of the total number of shipments in 1890) and the traffic on the river grew from 49,500 tonnes in 1862 to 128,800 tonnes in 1873. It then dropped to 107,200 tonnes and remained at this level through the 1890s.

Some barges were reinforced inside with metal stripes and could sustain up to 10 navigation seasons. Barges were equipped with roped weights, which were thrown overboard to increase the drag thereby reducing the barge speed when needed. The first steamship appeared on Chusovaya in 1841, it was a metal vessel named Nikita Demidov. For the first three years, the ship was bringing barges loaded with the production of the Staroutkinsky plant between Suksun and Levshino. In 1844, there was an attempt to run the ship in the middle reaches. After a 24-day trip, she managed to pass only  and then crashed, once again illustrating the difficulty of navigating the river.

River shipping declined after 1878 with the opening of the Gornozavodskaya railway. Since the early 20th century, shipment of metals was nearly halted and the barges were only occasionally transporting grain and supplies. The last barge trip occurred in 1920. As a result, many settlements along the river bank have been abandoned. However, the ironworks remained and provided the Soviet Army with metal during World War II.

Commercial use 
The Chusovaya is extensively used for water supply. In particular, water from Volchihinskoe reservoir is supplied to the Upper Iset Pond to serve the needs of Yekaterinburg and its suburbs. In order to improve the water supply, Nyazepetrovsk cascade was built in the mid 1970s. With this hydraulic system, Western Chusovaya was supplied with water from the Nyazepetrovsk reservoir on the Ufa. There are 15 small reservoirs at the plants on the tributaries of Chusovaya.

The river basin contains numerous deposits of iron, chromium, platinum, gold, diamond and coal. They were developed since the 17th century, some have been depleted and some are still being mined. Major settlements on the river (from source to the mouth) are Revda, Pervouralsk, Bilimbai, Staroutkinsk, Kyn, Ust-Koiva, Chusovoy and Verhnechusovskie Gorodki.

River is navigable from the city of Chusovoy, but the navigation sees very little commercial use nowadays. Besides, between the 1930s and early 1980s, the river basin was intensively used for logging; logs were rafted loose, i.e. neither guided nor bundled, that cluttered the river. The last such rafting was carried out on Chusovaya in 1973, and since 1990 it is legally prohibited in Russia.

Ecology
According to the Office for Environmental Protection of Perm Oblast, the water of the river near the town of Chusovoy is contaminated and does not meet the standards for the drinking and sanitary water. In 2006, the content of copper exceeded the maximum permissible concentration (MPC) twice, manganese 8 times, iron 5 times, petroleum 2 times (it was 21 times MPC in 2003) and hexavalent chromium 1.5 times (mostly due to the plant "Chrompic" in Pervouralsk). The biggest polluters of the river are Chusovskoy Steel Works and Chusovskoy Gorvodocanal.

Tourism 
Chusovaya has long been known for its rock formations, many of which have poetic names. They pose no dangers to light vessels and attract tourism. A tourist route was formed here in the 1960s and was visited by about 3,000 people per year. In one summer season of the 1980s, several tens of thousands tourists drafted along the river.

The major objects of attraction are the river banks, boitsy rocks and their caves and grottoes. Many of these rocks are under state protection as natural monuments. About 200,000 people annually visit the Kungur Cave near Chusovoy.

References

Rivers of Chelyabinsk Oblast
Rivers of Sverdlovsk Oblast
Rivers of Perm Krai